Austin Kelvin Doyle (7 November 1898 – 12 July 1970) was an American naval officer, admiral, chief of United States Taiwan Defense Command and Naval Air Training Command, who subsequently served as captain of the United States Navy for USS Hornet, Escort Carrier, USS Saratoga, and USS Nassau in World War II. After serving in US navy for forty years, he retired in 1958. Austin also served as a rear admiral.

Biography
Doyle was born in Port Richmond, Staten Island, New York and then moved to Pensacola, Florida when he spent about twenty years. In 1919, he attended Naval Academy at Annapolis where he did his graduation. He then joined the United States Navy Department for 41 years. President of United States conferred numerous military decorations upon him for his contribution to the US during World War II. In 1945 and 1946, he was awarded two Navy Cross awards and later, in the same year, government conferred two Legion of Merit military awards upon Doyle in recognition of his duty as commanding officer of an escort carrier in May 1943.

Personal life
Austin was married to Jamie Reese Doyle of Pensacola. He had four children, including three sons and a daughter. Apart from this, he had two siblings, a brother and a sister. Doyle had five grandchildren.

Admiral Doyle Drive in New Iberia, Louisiana, was named for him in the 1960s.

Death
Doyle was suffering from multiple ailments and was subsequently admitted to Pensacola Naval Air Station hospital and died at the same medical institute on 12 July 1970. He is buried at Barrancas National Cemetery in Pensacola, Florida.

References

External links
 

United States Navy personnel of World War II
People from Staten Island
Military personnel from New York City
United States Navy vice admirals
1898 births
1970 deaths
Recipients of the Legion of Merit
United States Naval Academy alumni
People from Pensacola, Florida
Recipients of the Navy Cross (United States)
Burials at Barrancas National Cemetery